Georgiy Zabirov  is an Uzbekistani football goalkeeper who played for Uzbekistan in the 2000 Asian Cup. He also played for FK Chirchik, SKA-Pahktakor-79 Toshkent, MSHK Toshkent, Neftchi Fargona, Navbahor Namangan and FK Andijon.

External links

Footballzz Profile

1974 births
Living people
Soviet footballers
Uzbekistani footballers
Uzbekistani people of Russian descent
People from Chirchiq
Association football goalkeepers
Uzbekistan international footballers